= Benny Robinson =

English footballer

Personal information
- Full name: Benjamin Robinson
- Place of birth: Broughton, England
- Position: Wing half

Senior career*
Years	Team	Apps	(Gls)
1918–1919	Swinburn		
1919–1922	Coventry City	27	(0)
1922	Nuneaton Town		
Total		27	(0)
- * Club domestic league appearances and goals

Benjamin Robinson was an English footballer who played in the Football League for Coventry City.
